The Accidental Gangster and the Mistaken Courtesan (literally "Gibang riot in 1724") is a 2008 South Korean action comedy film. The film depicts the gangster culture of Joseon Dynasty Korea and is based on an actual fight that occurred at a kisaeng house in 1724. The film was directed by Yeo Kyun-dong, and stars Lee Jung-jae—in his first film role for three years—alongside Kim Ok-bin. Costumes for the film were created by fashion designer André Kim.

Premise 
The film is set in Joseon Dynasty Korea, 1724. Cheon-doong, a hoodlum from a small village, meets and falls in love with Seol-ji, a kisaeng at Myeongwolhyang, a luxurious bar. One day he gets into a fight with the head of the Yangjoo gang, but later faces a crisis when the palace decides to crack down on gang activity at Myeongwolhyang. In his pursuit of Seol-ji, Cheon-doong inadvertently incurs the anger of the top-ranking gangster in the area, Man-deuk (Kim Suk Hoon).

Cast 
 Lee Jung-jae as Cheon-doong
 Kim Ok-bin as Seol-ji
 Kim Suk-hoon as Man-deuk
 Baek Do-bin as Se-jae
 Yeo Gyoon-dong as Jjak-gwi
 Lee Won-jong as Chil-gab
 Jeong Jae-hyeong as Bong-dal
 Jo Deok-hyeon as Sam Gook-ji
 Lee Won-jae as Excellency Song
 Hong Seok-cheon as tailor shop owner (cameo)

Release 
The Accidental Gangster and the Mistaken Courtesan was released in South Korea on 3 December 2008, a day earlier than originally scheduled.

References

External links 
 
 
 

2008 films
2008 action comedy films
2000s historical action films
2000s historical comedy films
Films about organized crime in Korea
Films directed by Yeo Kyun-dong
Films set in the 1720s
Films set in the Joseon dynasty
2000s Korean-language films
Sidus Pictures films
South Korean action comedy films
South Korean historical action films
South Korean historical comedy films
2000s South Korean films